Darcy Cameron (born 18 July 1995) is a professional Australian rules footballer playing for the Collingwood Football Club in the Australian Football League (AFL).

Early life
Originally from Albany, Western Australia, Cameron grew up as a West Coast Eagles fan. He is the nephew of radio personality and politician Eoin Cameron. He was a cricketer and swimmer in his youth and played football for North Albany. He attended Hale School as a boarder. Cameron played for Claremont in the West Australian Football League, averaging one goal, 11 disposals and 16 hitouts over 40 league matches. He wore number 18.

AFL career
Cameron was expected to be drafted by West Coast in the 2016 AFL draft, but was taken by Sydney with pick 48. He made a positive start, impressing coach John Longmire in his first pre-season. Cameron lacerated his finger during training in March. It was later infected in a North East Australian Football League (NEAFL) match against Sydney University, rendering him unavailable for one week. Shoulder surgery halfway through the year restricted him to nine NEAFL games. In April, Cameron signed a contract extension, tying him to Sydney until 2019.

In 2018, Sam Naismith's season-ending anterior cruciate ligament injury, Kurt Tippett's retirement and a quadriceps injury to Sam Reid opened up senior opportunities for Cameron. He played both JLT Community Series matches and showed good form in the NEAFL, averaging 34 hitouts, 19 possessions and one goal over 13 matches. However, he did not make his AFL debut until round 18 against the Gold Coast Suns at the Sydney Cricket Ground.

Statistics
Updated to the end of the 2022 season.

|-
| 2017 ||  || 17
| 0 || — || — || — || — || — || — || — || — || — || — || — || — || — || — || — || — || —
|- 
| 2018 ||  || 17
| 1 || 0 || 0 || 1 || 2 || 3 || 2 || 2 || 9 || 0 || 0 || 1.0 || 2.0 || 3.0 || 2.0 || 2.0 || 9.0 || 0
|-
| 2019 ||  || 17
| 0 || — || — || — || — || — || — || — || — || — || — || — || — || — || — || — || — || —
|- 
| 2020 ||  || 14
| 10 || 4 || 2 || 46 || 30 || 76 || 36 || 14 || 57 || 0.4 || 0.2 || 4.6 || 3.0 || 7.6 || 3.6 || 1.4 || 5.7 || 0
|-
| 2021 ||  || 14
| 18 || 22 || 9 || 147 || 72 || 219 || 99 || 32 || 121 || 1.2 || 0.5 || 8.2 || 4.0 || 12.2 || 5.5 || 1.8 || 6.7 || 0
|- 
| 2022 ||  || 14
| 24 || 20 || 8 || 204 || 108 || 312 || 91 || 80 || 423 || 0.8 || 0.3 || 8.5 || 4.5 || 13.0 || 3.8 || 3.3 || 17.6 || 4
|- class=sortbottom
! colspan=3 | Career
! 53 !! 46 !! 19 !! 398 !! 212 !! 610 !! 228 !! 128 !! 610 !! 0.9 !! 0.4 !! 7.5 !! 4.0 !! 11.5 !! 4.3 !! 2.4 !! 11.5 !! 4
|}

Notes

References

External links 
 
 
 
 WAFL playing statistics

Living people
1995 births
Sydney Swans players
North Albany Football Club players
Claremont Football Club players
People from Albany, Western Australia
Australian rules footballers from Western Australia
Collingwood Football Club players